Martin Švagerko (born 2 October 1967) is a Czechoslovak/Slovak former ski jumper.

Career
He won two team large hill medals at the FIS Nordic World Ski Championships with a silver in 1993 and a bronze in 1989.

Svagerko's best individual finish at the Winter Olympics was 25th in the individual normal hill at Lillehammer in 1994. He also finished 28th in the 1990 Ski-flying World Championships in Norway.

Svagerko had two individual normal hill victories in his career (1984, 1986).

World Cup

Standings

Wins

External links

1967 births
Living people
Slovak male ski jumpers
Czechoslovak male ski jumpers
Ski jumpers at the 1984 Winter Olympics
Ski jumpers at the 1994 Winter Olympics
Olympic ski jumpers of Slovakia
Olympic ski jumpers of Czechoslovakia
Sportspeople from Banská Bystrica
FIS Nordic World Ski Championships medalists in ski jumping